Sandro Djurić (born 15 February 1994) is an Austrian footballer. In the past, Djurić played in its home country for teams such as FC Liefering, SV Grödig, Wiener Neustadt or Austria Lustenau. He is of Serbian descent.

Honours
FC Liefering
Regionalliga West: 2012–13

References

External links

1994 births
Living people
People from St. Johann im Pongau District
Austrian footballers
Austria youth international footballers
Austria under-21 international footballers
Association football midfielders
FC Red Bull Salzburg players
Austrian Football Bundesliga players
SV Grödig players
2. Liga (Austria) players
Austrian Regionalliga players
FC Liefering players
SC Wiener Neustadt players
SC Austria Lustenau players
Liga II players
FC Rapid București players
FC Dunărea Călărași players
Austrian expatriate footballers
Austrian people of Serbian descent
Austrian expatriate sportspeople in Romania
Expatriate footballers in Romania
Footballers from Salzburg (state)